Joseph John Klinger (August 2, 1902 – July 31, 1960) was a first baseman, catcher, and left fielder who played in Major League Baseball in 1927 and 1930. Klinger played in three games for the New York Giants in 1927 and in four games for the Chicago White Sox in 1930.

References

External links

1902 births
1960 deaths
Major League Baseball first basemen
Major League Baseball catchers
Major League Baseball left fielders
Baseball players from Pennsylvania
New York Giants (NL) players
Chicago White Sox players
People from Canonsburg, Pennsylvania
Jackson Generals (KITTY League) players